No. 156 Helicopter Unit is a Helicopter Unit and is equipped with Mil Mi-17V5 and based at Bagdogra Air Force Station.

History

Assignments

Aircraft
Mil Mi-17V5

References

156